"Year of the Cat" is a song by Scottish singer-songwriter Al Stewart, released as a single in July 1976 in the UK (October 1976 in the U.S.). The song is the title track of his 1976 album Year of the Cat, and was recorded at Abbey Road Studios, London, in January 1976 by engineer Alan Parsons. The song reached number 8 on the Billboard Hot 100 in March 1977. Although Stewart's highest placed single on that chart was 1978's "Time Passages", "Year of the Cat" has remained Stewart's signature recording, receiving regular airplay on both classic rock and folk rock stations.

Composition
Co-written by Peter Wood, "Year of the Cat" is a narrative song written in the second person whose protagonist, a tourist, is visiting an exotic market when a mysterious silk-clad woman appears and takes him away for a gauzy romantic adventure. On waking the next day beside her, the tourist notes that his tour bus has left without him, and decides to stay where he is for the time being.

Per the Financial Times, Stewart's "girlfriend left a book of Vietnamese astrology open at the page for the Year of the Cat, then just beginning, the words fitted the same four notes — and also contained the word 'of'. Stewart was obsessed with Bob Dylan’s 'of' songs — 'Masters of War', 'Chimes of Freedom', and presumably in 1975, 'Simple Twist of Fate' — believing that the preposition made them sound 'portentous'. When he watched Casablanca on television, an opening couplet came to him: “In a morning from a Bogart movie, in a country where they turn back time/ You go strolling through the crowd like Peter Lorre contemplating a crime… ”

In the Vietnamese zodiac, the Cat is one of the twelve signs, corresponding to the Rabbit in the Chinese zodiac. At the time of the song's relese, the most recent Y ar of the Rabbit had been 11 February 1975 to 30 J uary 1976; thus, the song was written and recorded in the Vietnamese Yar of the Cat.

The song began as "Foot of the Stage", a song written by Stewart in 1966 after seeing a performance by comedian Tony H cock whose patter about "being a complete loser" who might as well "end t all right here" drew laughs from he audience: Stewart's intuitive response that Hancock was in genuine despair led to the writing of "Foot of the Stage". It was the melody for this never-recorded song to which Stewart set the lyrics of "Year of the Cat" in 1975. Pianist Peter Wood was given a co-writing credit on the song. Stewart explained Wood's involvement in the creation of "Year of the Cat" during a concert in Edmonds, Washington in November 2017. He recalled that he was opening for Linda Ronstadt during a 1975 tour of the United States and receiving a decidedly mixed reaction from audiences when he noticed the pianist (presumably Wood) using a catchy chord progression during soundchecks. Stewart asked if he could add words to the notes, but the pianist said no. Stewart incorporated the notes into the melodic line of "The Year of the Cat" anyway.

Recording
The track is noted for its lengthy instrumental sections—over four minutes of the 6:40 album version is instrumental, including a long, melodic series of solos that encompass cello, violin, piano, acoustic guitar, distorted electric guitar, synthesizer and saxophone. Tim Renwick plays both the acoustic lead and electric lead and George Ford plays bass. Parsons had Phil Kenzie add the alto saxophone part of the song—and by doing so transformed the original folk concept into the jazz-influenced ballad that put Al Stewart onto the charts.

According to Stewart on an episode of In the Studio with Redbeard (which devoted an episode to the making of the Year of the Cat album), Phil Kenzie was watching a movie and didn't want to be bothered with going to do session work; but as a favour to Alan Parsons he went to Abbey Road, and the sax solos were recorded in one or two takes, after which Kenzie left the studio to go back home and watch the rest of his movie. Stewart also told Redbeard that he didn't like the sax solos at first but grew to like them.
 
Shorter versions of the track can be found on some European 7" single formats. Though both of the discs carry the same label and catalogue number (RCA PB 5007), the French single features the A-side track clocking in at 4:30, while the Italian one features an even shorter mix of just 3:30 so that the lengthy instrumental intro is completely missing.

Subsequent to the entry of the single on the US charts, the track afforded Stewart a major hit in Australia (no. 13), Belgium/Flemish Region (no. 7), Canada (no. 3), Italy (no. 5), the Netherlands (no. 6) and New Zealand (no. 15). In the UK, where the single had been overlooked on its original July 1976 release, it gained renewed interest which was evident in a Top 40 chart entry although interest levelled off outside the Top 30 with a number 31 peak in January 1977. "Year of the Cat" would remain Stewart's sole chart single in his native UK.

Structure

The song is mainly written in E minor/G major, with the electric guitar solo in the bridge in D major.

Personnel

Al Stewart – vocals, guitar, keyboards
Tim Renwick – acoustic guitar, electric guitar
Peter Wood – keyboards
Don Lobster – keyboards
George Ford – bass
Stuart Elliott – drums, percussion
Andrew Powell – string arrangements
Bobby Bruce – violin
Marion Driscoll – triangle
Phil Kenzie – alto saxophone

Chart performance

Weekly charts

Year-end charts

Cover versions
Hector recorded the song with his own Finnish lyrics as "Kissojen Yö" on his 1978 album Kadonneet Lapset. The Spanish rendering "El año del gato" was recorded by Érica García for her 2001 album release El cerebro.

A cover version by F. R. David appeared on the 1999 album Words – '99 Version.

The experimental band Psapp recorded a version for the compilation Take It Easy: 15 Soft Rock Anthems in 2006, which contained cat sound effects.

The song was sampled in Purple Disco Machine's "In My Arms", a non-album single released in 2020.

Appearances in media
Another version of the song, also performed by Stewart, appears on Volume 1 of the Cities 97 Sampler.

The song appears in the film version of Running with Scissors (2006) and in the film Radiofreccia (1998), the directorial debut of Italian rock star Luciano Ligabue.

In 2013, the song was used during the end credits of "The Dinner" episode of HBO show Hello Ladies.

In 2008, the song was used during the open credits of Freeform show Year of the Cat.

The song is used frequently as bumper music on the late-night radio talk show Coast to Coast AM.

The song also appears in the German film Die Katze.

References

External links
"Year of the Cat" at songfacts.com

1976 singles
Al Stewart songs
1976 songs
RCA Records singles
Song recordings produced by Alan Parsons